{{DISPLAYTITLE:C27H30O14}}
The molecular formula C27H30O14 (molar mass: 578.52 g/mol, exact mass: 578.1636 u) may refer to:

 Kaempferitrin, a flavonol
 Rhoifolin, a flavone